Punctifera is a genus of very small ectoparasitic sea snails, marine gastropod mollusks or micromollusks in the family Eulimidae.

Species
Species within the genera Punctifera include:
 Punctifera ophiomoerae Warén, 1981

References

Eulimidae